William Robertson (born 14 April 1993) is a Scottish footballer who plays as a midfielder for Darvel.

He has previously played for Dundee United, Forfar Athletic, Alloa Athletic, Annan Athletic, Stirling Albion and East Kilbride.

Career
Robertson began his footballing career at Dundee United's Academy, and was loaned to Forfar Athletic in December 2012, making his debut on the 1st, scoring in a 2–1 home win over Ayr United. The loan was later extended until May 2013 on 4 January.

On 2 July 2013, Robertson signed for Alloa Athletic. He made his debut on 17 August 2013, in a 1–0 away loss against Dundee. His contract with Alloa expired at the end of the season, although he was offered the chance to return to the club for pre-season training.

On 26 July 2014, Robertson played for Stirling Albion as a trialist in their Scottish Challenge Cup match against Elgin City. Robertson signed a contract with Stirling soon afterwards. After two seasons with Albion, Robertson signed for Annan Athletic in July 2016. Robertson left Annan in October 2016, returning to Forthbank Stadium where he played 3 matches as a trialist for Stirling, before signing a contract with the club during the 2017 winter transfer window. Robertson left Albion in October 2018 due to work commitments.

Robertson signed with Lowland League team East Kilbride in January 2019.

Career statistics

References

External links

1993 births
Living people
Scottish footballers
Association football midfielders
Dundee United F.C. players
Forfar Athletic F.C. players
Alloa Athletic F.C. players
Stirling Albion F.C. players
Annan Athletic F.C. players
Scottish Football League players
Scottish Professional Football League players